Pristimantis nyctophylax, also known as Tandapi robber frog or watchful rainfrog, is a species of frog in the family Strabomantidae. It is endemic to Ecuador where it is known from the western flank of the Andes in the Cotopaxi and Pichincha Provinces. Its natural habitat is tropical cloud forests. It is threatened by habitat loss.

References

Amphibians described in 1976
nyctophylax
Endemic fauna of Ecuador
Amphibians of Ecuador
Amphibians of the Andes
Taxonomy articles created by Polbot